The University Professors Program (UNI) was a program within Boston University that granted degrees in fields that combined, bridged, or fell between established intellectual disciplines. Consulting closely with faculty, students designed their own cross-disciplinary programs of study that often transcended those of any School or College at Boston University.  The program was phased out in May 2011.

Program description
The distinguished group of faculty who make up the University Professors Program have built their own intellectual bridges between various disciplines of the humanities, social sciences, and natural sciences. This integrated approach to scholarship is reflected in the courses they teach and in the guidance they offer their students. The University Professors are some of the most distinguished scholars at Boston University, including Nobel Prize winners, MacArthur Fellows, and members of international academies, and their counsel enables all UNI students to get to know leading authorities in many disciplines.

For undergraduates in their first year in UNI, students are required to take core courses that emphasize the nature and methodology of scholarly inquiry in the humanities, the social sciences, and the physical and biological sciences. These courses are specially designed and open only to UNI students. Students will also be required to study a foreign language for four semesters and to attend a weekly seminar, at which the University Professors and occasional distinguished guests will present the fruits of their own scholarship for examination and discussion.

In the second year, students complete one further Core course and choose from a variety of elective courses given by University Professors. Under the guidance of their faculty advisors, students then select appropriate courses from throughout the University that reflect their growing academic interests. Students enrolled in the University Professors Program develop a program of study that is a synthesis of disciplines into a single, individually created concentration. The courses they choose also prepare students for the formulation and writing of a senior thesis. All students are required to complete and defend such a thesis during their senior year.

Although undergraduate students enrolled in the University Professors Program do not normally have to specify a major, they can elect to do a double major by combining their UNI special degree program with a major in another School or College of the University, under the aegis of the Boston University Collaborative Degree Program (BUCOP).

The UNI program also had a very active doctoral degree program which similarly facilitated education and training between departments, Schools, Colleges, and even other local Universities and Medical Schools. 

Example concentrations included:
International Affairs and Linguistics;
Banach Manifolds on Harbater Theory;
Literary and Cultural Studies;
Public Theology and Social Criticism;
Music Cognition;
Sociology of Education and American Civilization;
Business Administration and Media Studies;
Neuroscience, Robotics, and Philosophy;
Psychiatry, Infectious Disease, and Public Health;
Neurophysiology; and Bio-Organic Chemistry.

Faculty

References

External links
 The UNI website

Boston University
Educational institutions disestablished in 2011